Mariama Jamanka (born 23 August 1990) is a retired German bobsledder who won Gold in the two-woman event with Lisa Buckwitz at the 2018 Winter Olympics.

Career
A former discus and hammer thrower of Berlin, Jamanka became a bobsledder in 2013. She entered the Bobsleigh World Cup during the 2015–16 season. In January 2017, she won the European Championship in Winterberg with brakewoman Annika Drazek. Later the same year, she was part of the gold-winning German team in the mixed team event at the IBSF World Championships in Königssee.

Before the 2018 Winter Olympics in Pyeongchang, Germany's head coach René Spies changed the brakewomen of the country's two leading two-women bobsleighs: Drazek was assigned to pilot Stephanie Schneider, while Jamanka had to work with Schneider's former brakewoman Lisa Buckwitz, with Schneider and Drazek being the most aspiring German team for the Pyeongchang Games. However, Jamanka and Buckwitz won the event, winning Germany's first two-woman bobsleigh medal since 2006, while Schneider and Drazek, who both became injured during the Games, finished fourth.

Jamanka announced her retirement from the sport in April 2022.

Personal
Mariama's mother is German, and her father is from the Gambia.

References

External links
 

1990 births
Living people
German female bobsledders
Olympic bobsledders of Germany
Bobsledders at the 2018 Winter Olympics
Bobsledders at the 2022 Winter Olympics
Sportspeople from Berlin
Olympic gold medalists for Germany
Olympic silver medalists for Germany
Medalists at the 2018 Winter Olympics
Medalists at the 2022 Winter Olympics
Olympic medalists in bobsleigh
21st-century German women